This is a list of chapters of Yu-Gi-Oh! Zexal and Yu-Gi-Oh! D Team Zexal, adaptations of Yu-Gi-Oh! Zexal anime. Yu-Gi-Oh! Zexal was, written by Shin Yoshida and illustrated by Naohito Miyoshi. It was published by Shueisha and serialized by V-Jump from December 18, 2010 to June 21, 2015. Yu-Gi-Oh! D Team Zexal was written by Akihiro Tomonaga and illustrated by Wedge Holdings. It was published by Shueisha and serialized by V-Jump from April 3, 2012 to April 3, 2014. They are two Yu-Gi-Oh! manga spin-off titles.

Yu-Gi-Oh! Zexal

Yu-Gi-Oh! D Team Zexal
Chapter 1:  (April 3, 2012)
Chapter 2:  (May 3, 2012)
Chapter 3:  (June 3, 2012)
Chapter 4:  (July 3, 2012)
Chapter 5:  (August 3, 2012)
Chapter 6:  (September 3, 2012)
Chapter 7:  (October 3, 2012)
Chapter 8:  (November 3, 2012)
Chapter 9:  (December 3, 2012)
Chapter 10:  (January 3, 2013)
Chapter 11:  (February 3, 2013)
Chapter 12:  (March 3, 2013)
Chapter 13:  (April 3, 2013)
Chapter 14:  (June 3, 2013)
Chapter 15:  (July 3, 2013)
Chapter 16:  (August 3, 2013)
Chapter 17:  (September 3, 2013)
Chapter 18:  (October 3, 2013)
Chapter 19:  (November 3, 2013)
Chapter 20:  (December 3, 2013)
Chapter 21:  (January 3, 2014)
Chapter 22:  (February 3, 2014)
Chapter 23:  (March 3, 2014)
Final Chapter:  (April 3, 2014)

References

Yu-Gi-Oh! Zexal
Zexal